The Hijaz Mountains () or "Hejaz Range" is a mountain range located in the Hejazi region of western Saudi Arabia. The range runs north and south along the eastern coast of the Red Sea, and can thus be treated as including the Midian Mountains, and being part of the Sarawat Mountains, broadly speaking.

Geography 

The western coastal escarpment of the Arabian Peninsula is composed of two mountain ranges, the Hijaz Mountain to the north and the Asir Mountains farther south, with a gap between them near the middle of the peninsula's coastline.

The mountain wall drops abruptly on the western side toward the Red Sea, leaving the narrow coastal plain of Tihamah. The eastern slopes are not as steep, allowing rare rainfall to help create oasis around the springs and wells of the few wadis.

River or wadi 
The Hijaz Mountains have been conjectured as the source of the ancient Pishon River, that was described as one of the four rivers associated with the Garden of Eden. This is a component in the research of Juris Zarins that locates the Garden of Eden at the northern tip of the Persian Gulf near Kuwait. The course of the now dried up river, the modern-day Wadi al-Rummah and its extension Wadi al-Batin, was identified by Farouk El-Baz of Boston University and named the 'Kuwait River.' The 'Pishon' or 'Kuwait River,' and the Hejazi region's ecology, is estimated to have dried up 2,500–3000 years ago.

Wildlife 

The Arabian leopard had been sighted here. In ancient times, it was reported that Musa al-Kadhim, a descendant of Muhammad, encountered a lion in the wilderness north of Medina. Hamadryas baboons can be seen near settlements, like those of Al Hada and Al-Shafa near Ta'if.

Mining 
This region includes the district of Mahd adh-Dhahab ("Cradle of the Gold"), between Mecca and Medina. It is the only known Arabian source for workable quantities of gold.

Gallery

See also 

 Al Harrah, Saudi Arabia
 Biblical Mount Sinai
 Geology of Saudi Arabia
 List of mountains in Saudi Arabia

References

Further reading 
 A Journey Through the Tihama, the 'Asir, and the Hijaz Mountains, by Wilfred Thesiger

External links 
 Hijaz Mountains (YouTube)
 Lightning Clouds on Makkah-Madinah Al Hijaz Mountains Highway.10.04.2012
 Hijaz mountains – Climbing, Hiking & Mountaineering

Mountain ranges of Saudi Arabia
Hejaz